Bashu culture, sometimes also named Chongqing-Sichuan culture, refers to the culture of Sichuan province and Chongqing city, China and the surrounding areas, including parts of the neighboring provinces of Yunnan and Guizhou, since the Han Chinese subgroups in these two provinces also primarily speak Southwestern Mandarin nowadays. It has a long history of over 3000 years, claimed to be one of the cradles of modern Chinese civilization.

Ancient writing system

Traditional language

Architecture

Sichuanese architecture

Sichuanese garden

Visual arts

Performing arts

Food culture

Philosophy

Others

See also
Sichuanese people
Culture of Gansu
Culture of Qinghai
Culture of Yunnan
Tibetan culture

External links
The Center for Bashu Cultural Studies of Sichuan Normal University (English website)

References